The Mixed 2 x 2 x 400 metres relay at the 2021 IAAF World Relays was held at Silesian Stadium on 1 May. It was the second time that this event was held at the World Athletics Relays, after being first held in 2019. Each team had to comprise one man and one woman, who would each run twice, but could be lined up in any order.

Records 
Prior to the competition, the records were as follows:

Results

Final

References 

2021 World Athletics Relays
4 × 400 metres relay
Mixed-sex athletics
IAAF World Relays 2021
Relays